Jonathan Lloyd may refer to:

Jonathan Lloyd (composer) (born 1948), British composer
Jonathan Lloyd (priest) (born 1956), Anglican priest
Johnathan Loyd (born 1991), American basketball player

See also
Jonathan Lloyd Walker (born 1967), English-Canadian film and television actor, producer and screenwriter 
John Lloyd (disambiguation)